This is a list of low-power television stations (LPTV) in the United States, transmitting on VHF channel 6, which operate as radio stations capable of being picked up by standard FM receivers. These stations are colloquially known as "Franken FMs", a reference to Frankenstein's monster, because TV stations functioning as radio stations had not been envisioned by the Federal Communications Commission (FCC). The FCC commonly refers to these stations as "FM6" operations.

First devised in 2002, until July 14, 2021 most of these stations employed the original NTSC-M analog TV transmission standard. However, as of that date the FCC required that all TV stations that had not received a waiver had to cease analog transmissions, which meant that only the stations using a specially modified version of the ATSC 3.0 "NextGenTV" digital standard could still be received by standard FM radios.

Background
These stations transmit an analog FM signal centered at 87.75 MHz, designated by receiver and station marketing as "87.7 FM". This is just below the lowest FM band frequency of 87.9 MHz, thus receivable by most consumer radios. Although primarily functioning as radio stations, they are formally licensed as TV stations, thus are still required to provide some sort of video signal in order to comply with FCC regulations. However the type of TV programming is not specified, and low-power TV stations are exempt from educational and informational programming mandates and are thus — unlike full-power and Class A TV stations — not required to provide three hours of educational children's programming per week.

While operating using analog transmissions, television video commonly consisted of minimal offerings, such as still frames, test patterns, automated weather conditions and news, or silent films. Audio for both television and FM reception was identical. (TV signals potentially could have carried separate audio through their Second audio program (SAP) feeds, although none did so as of 2019.) With digital transmissions, audio for TV and radio reception is sent separately.

The existence of largely unregulated commercial radio stations at 87.7 MHz, adjacent to the 87.9 to 91.9 FM frequencies reserved for non-commercial operations, has led to requests that the FCC either eliminate, or formally regulate, these stations. In an October 2014 review, the FCC requested comments on "whether to allow LPTV stations on digital television channel 6 (82-88 MHz) to operate analog FM radio-type services on an ancillary or supplementary basis pursuant to section 73.624(c) of the rules". In 2015 the commission further stated that: "We intend to issue a decision on whether to permit digital LPTV stations to operate analog FM radio type services on an ancillary or supplementary basis at a later date." On December 4, 2019 the FCC issued a Public Notice that solicited additional public comments, in preparation for the July 13, 2021 deadline for all LPTV stations to switch from analog to digital transmissions. However, the commission never made a formal decision about the status of these stations.

On May 17, 2022 Jessica Rosenworcel, head FCC commissioner, announced that one of the agenda items for an upcoming FCC Open Meeting, "Preserving Local Radio Programming (MB Docket No. 03-185)", "will consider a proposal to allow these broadcasters to continue their existing FM6 radio service, provided that they meet certain conditions, including interference protection and the provision of a synchronous TV service to consumers." However, this agenda item was dropped as being no longer needed, due to the June 6, 2022 adoption of a "Fifth Notice of Proposed Rulemaking" for MB Docket No. 03-185, which requested additional public comments about the best use of the frequencies assigned to TV channel 6.

Analog TV transmissions
Under the original NTSC-M analog standards, a TV station's audio and video components are broadcast separately, with the audio transmitted as an FM signal. In 1945, TV channel 6 was assigned use of 82-88 MHz, with the channel's audio located at a center frequency of 87.75 MHz. That same year the standard FM broadcasting band was reassigned to 80 channels from 88.1 to 105.9 MHz, which was soon expanded to 100 channels ending at 107.9 MHz (channels 201–300). One additional FM channel, at 87.9 MHz (channel 200), was added in 1978.

The location of TV channel 6's audio just below the FM band meant that many consumer FM radios could readily pick up the sound from channel 6 stations. Full-power stations sometimes promoted this as a valuable feature for commuters and in emergency situations, although the primary audience remained TV viewers. A few specialty "TV Sound" receivers were sold that could pick up audio from the VHF band TV stations, which were sometimes marketed to office workers who wanted to listen to their favorite daytime TV programs. Also, some Japanese and Soviet receivers could tune further down the VHF low band, making it possible to receive audio from VHF channel 5 at 81.75 MHz using Japanese band receivers that tuned to 76 MHz, while Soviet OIRT band receivers included audio reception of VHF channels 4 (71.75 MHz) and 3 (65.75 MHz).

In 1982, licensing began of a new classification of "Low Power Television" stations (LPTV). Eventually a small number of channel 6 LPTV stations determined it was more profitable to operate as de facto radio stations, although this had not been anticipated by the FCC. On August 1, 2002 KZND-LP, a channel 6 LPTV station in Anchorage, Alaska, began promoting itself as a musical format radio station on 87.7 MHz. Competing local conventional radio stations quickly challenged this as a misuse of a TV station authorization, but the FCC determined that as long as KZNP transmitted sufficient visual features, which did not have to be coordinated with the sound, the station was in compliance with regulations. Moreover, as a TV station it was exempt from having to follow any radio station rules. In early 2008 Monitoring Times magazine reported the existence of three channel 6 de facto radio stations in addition to KZND: KSFV-LP in Los Angeles; K06NC in Kauai, Hawaii; and WNYZ-LP in New York City. A Radio World review later that year identified a total of eight ongoing examples. In late 2019, InsideRadio identified 28 active stations.

With the mandatory 2009 digital television transition in the United States, full power TV stations were required to switch from analog to ATSC 1.0 digital transmissions. This meant that their audio could no longer be picked up by FM radios, as the ATSC 1.0 format is incompatible with both FM's analog and digital in-band on-channel HD Radio standards.

A switchover to digital transmissions was not immediately required for low power TV stations, and some channel 6 stations retained their analog transmitters in order to function primarily as radio stations. The FCC notified these stations that eventually all low power TV stations would be required to convert to digital transmissions, which, after a series of extensions, was finally set for July 13, 2021. On July 6, 2021 an FCC Public Notice reiterated that "After 11:59 p.m. local time on July 13, 2021, LPTV/translator stations may no longer operate any facility in analog mode and all analog licenses shall automatically cancel at that time, without any affirmative action by the Commission." (A waiver, delaying the required change until January 10, 2022, was issued for 15 Alaska translators, but a low-power Alaska station broadcasting on channel 6, KNIK-LP in Anchorage, was not included in this waiver.)

The prohibition of analog transmissions resulted in the elimination of an estimated 28 de facto radio operations, although some of these stations eventually returned after installing upgraded ATSC 3.0 transmitters.

Digital TV transmissions
Attempts to have analog FM signals coexist with the original ATSC 1.0 digital standards proved unsuccessful. In 2009 WRGB, a full-power channel 6 station in Schenectady, New York, was ordered by the FCC to cease experimentation. In 2012 Venture Technologies Group, which owns several channel 6 low power TV stations in major markets, applied to install modified versions of the ATSC 1.0 standard in order to add an FM signal for channel 6 LPTV stations KFMP-LP in Lubbock, Texas and WBPA-LP in Pittsburgh, Pennsylvania. However, the FCC denied this request, stating that, among other deficiencies, this "proposal is likely to increase the interference potential to co-channel DTV operations".

A newer, and currently optional, digital TV transmission standard, "NEXTGEN TV" ATSC 3.0, was determined to have more potential, and Venture Technologies developed a revised approach for allowing an analog FM audio subcarrier to coexist with an ATSC 3.0 digital TV signal. The company cited the FCC rules, which provides that "DTV broadcast stations are permitted to offer services of any nature, consistent with the public interest, convenience, and necessity, on an ancillary or supplementary basis", and in general affords broadcasters broad permission "to offer services of any nature" as long as they "do not derogate DTV broadcast stations' obligations" to transmit at least one over-the-air video program signal at no direct charge to viewers, a distinction that Venture says allows a digital television signal to incorporate an FM analog subcarrier.

The basic ATSC 3.0 standard specifies a full 6 MHz channel for the digital signal, but running a hybrid DTV/FM service reduces the DTV transmission bandwidth slightly, shifting the center frequency of the digital signal about 160 kHz below the channel center. To ensure the analog FM signal does not interfere with the ATSC 3.0 DTV signal, a modified combiner and filtering system must be used prior to feeding the broadcast signals to the antenna.

Venture's KBKF-LD in San Jose, California began transmitting an FM subcarrier using the ATSC 3.0 TV standard in February 2021. On June 10, 2021 the FCC issued a six-month Special Temporary Authority (STA) grant allowing KBKF-LD to include analog FM broadcasts on 87.75 MHz using this dual transmission approach. A second Venture station, WRME-LD in Chicago, was also provisionally authorized to use the new standard, until January 10, 2022.

STA applications for ATSC 3.0/FM operation by KXDP-LD in Denver, WMTO-LD in Norfolk, Virginia and WTBS-LD in Atlanta were approved July 16, 2021, for the period through January 15, 2022. On July 27, 2021 an STA was issued for KZNO-LD in Big Bear Lake, California, expiring on January 27, 2022.

As of May 18, 2022, the FCC's Media Bureau stated that there were currently 13 "FM6 operators... providing service pursuant to engineering STA".

Stations currently authorized using a modified ATSC 3.0 standard
The following channel 6 TV stations are authorized to use versions of the ATSC 3.0 digital TV standard that includes an FM analog signal that can be received on standard radios at 87.7 FM. The eventual legal and technical status of these stations is subject to FCC review.

California
KEFM-LD Sacramento
KRPE-LD San Diego
KBKF-LD San Jose
KZNO-LD Big Bear Lake

Colorado
KXDP-LD Denver

Florida
 WEYS-LD Miami

Georgia
WTBS-LD Atlanta

Illinois
WRME-LD Chicago

Maryland
WOWZ-LD Salisbury

Nevada
KGHD-LD Las Vegas

New York
WNYZ-LD New York City

Tennessee
WPGF-LD Memphis

Texas
KZFW-LD Dallas
KBFW-LD Arlington (broadcasting audio at 87.9 FM)
KFLZ-LD San Antonio (broadcasting audio at 87.9 FM)

Virginia
WDCN-LD Fairfax
WMTO-LD Norfolk (simulcast on WXTG-FM)

LPTV stations that transmitted FM radio programming using the analog standard prior to July 14, 2021

The following channel 6 low power TV stations previously included radio-style programming on an FM analog signal centered on 87.75 MHz when broadcasting using the NTSC-M analog TV standard:

Alaska
KNIK-LP Anchorage

California
KLOA-LP Antelope Valley
KNNN-LP Redding
KRPE-LP San Diego
KUHD-LP Ventura
KZNO-LP Big Bear Lake
KBKF-LP San Jose (switched to digital in February 2021)

Colorado
KXDP-LP Denver

Florida
WEYS-LP Miami

Georgia
WTBS-LP Atlanta

Illinois
WRME-LP Chicago

Louisiana
KXKW-LP Lafayette

Maryland
WOWZ-LP Salisbury

Mississippi
WJMF-LP Jackson

Nevada
KGHD-LP Las Vegas

New York
WVOA-LP Syracuse
WXXW-LP Binghamton

Texas
KFLZ-LP San Antonio
KZFW-LP Dallas
KJIB-LP Houston
KJIB broadcast audio at 87.89 MHz because of interference from other channel 6 low-power stations. The station was licensed only to channel 5, and its license surrendered in 2014, but a local church has tried to modify the terms of license to allow its operation. The FCC in 2018 submitted a Notice of Unlicensed Operation to the station.
KIPS-LD in Beaumont

Virginia
WMTO-LP Norfolk (simulcast on WXTG-FM) 
WDCN-LP Fairfax

Wyoming
KSHW-LP Sheridan

See also
FM broadcasting in the United States
87.7 FM
87.8 FM
Pulse 87

References

06 radio
 Channel 6
Lists of radio stations in the United States